Bolivia–China relations are foreign relations between the Plurinational State of Bolivia and People's Republic of China. Relations between both nations officially began on July 9, 1985. Both nations are members of the United Nations.

History 
Since the establishment of diplomatic ties between China and Bolivia in 1985, relations have expanded from economic and cultural ties to military, transport, infrastructure, raw materials, education and other areas.

The two countries celebrated 25th anniversary of diplomatic ties in Beijing, July 9, 2010.

In August 2010, China and Bolivia agreed to continue to develop military ties and cooperation.

Bilateral relations 
Bilateral trade began from very low volumes at approximately $4 million. This increase to over $27.76 million in 2002.

China's exports to Bolivia includes hardware, machinery, light industrial goods, textiles and daily necessities.

Bolivian exports to China were lumber and mineral ore.

China provided support for the establishment of the Bolivian Space Agency and the launch of its first satellite in 2014 for a total cost of US$300 million. China and also provides loans, e.g. of 67 million dollars to upgrade infrastructure in the Oruro region.

A Chinese firm is a partner in a lithium mining operation in Bolivia valued at $2.3 billion.

Surveillance systems 
In 2019, China developed the purpose of overhauling the Bolivian security system worth more than 105 million dollars. This system comprises new surveillance cameras, drones, automated evidence processing systems, and increased manpower to manage each of these new technologies, which have been collectively dubbed the BOL 110. The Bolivian Government said BOL 110 implementing artificial intelligence to counter crime. Some individuals have expressed concern about the nature and the pervasiveness of these technologies, however, and how they may be used to create a Bolivian police state. The recent employment of dubious surveillance and manipulation tactics by the Bolivian government may validate these concerns, with some scholars going so far as to warn that similar systems can encourage authoritarian practices.

Resident diplomatic missions
 Bolivia has an embassy in Beijing.
 China has an embassy in La Paz and a consulate-general in Santa Cruz de la Sierra.

See also 
 Foreign relations of Bolivia
 Foreign relations of China

Bibliography

References

External links 
 Chinese Embassy in Bolivia

 

 
Bilateral relations of China
China